Mark Hurley (born December 12, 1936 - Johnson City, Tennessee) is a retired NASCAR Grand National Series driver. He has raced in NASCAR for four years and has competed in 16 races with one finish in the top five and two finishes in the top ten. Hurley has accomplished 2,263 laps of racing to accumulate a career earnings total of $2,630 ($ when adjusted for inflation). The average career start for this driver would be 18th while the average career finish would be 19th place. Hurley was a car owner for three races (driving a 1963 Ford Galaxie) before selling his ride.

References

1936 births
Living people
NASCAR drivers
NASCAR team owners
People from Johnson City, Tennessee
Racing drivers from Tennessee